Juan Gabriel Nolasco Sandoval (born February 24, 1975) is a Mexican football manager and former player.

References

1975 births
Living people
Club Puebla players
Liga MX players
Association football midfielders
Footballers from Puebla
Mexican football managers
Mexican footballers